The chorister robin-chat (Cossypha dichroa) (previously known as the chorister robin) is a species of bird in the family Muscicapidae.
It is found in South Africa and Eswatini. Its distribution stretches from the southern Western Cape through the Eastern Cape, KwaZulu-Natal, and Mpumalanga to northern Limpopo.

Its natural habitat is evergreen forests, especially in the mist belt region.
This is a large robin-chat, about 20 cm in length. The chorister robin-chat is identified by its dark upperparts (the ear coverts and lores are slightly darker than the rest of the face, head, neck and back) and yellow-orange underparts. It has no white eye stripe. Juveniles have a sooty, mottled tawny-buff above and below and its tail is red-orange with a dark centre.

The chorister robin-chat is generally solitary. This robin-chat skulks in dense foliage in the forest canopy. In winter it may forage on ground, but usually gleans insects from leaves. It also follows other fauna in its habitat that might disturb insects, which it then hawks. Its diet consists mainly of insects, millipedes, spiders, ticks and fruit in winter. The chorister robin-chat breeds from October to January; it peaks during November. There has been a record where it plays host to red-chested cuckoo, a brood parasite.
The chorister robin-chat moves from the interior to coastal forests in winter.

References

 'Robert's Birds of Southern Africa; Sixth Edition; 1993; Gordon Lindsay Maclean'
 Biodiversity Explorer; 
 Chorister robin-chat - Species text in The Atlas of Southern African Birds.

chorister robin-chat
Birds of Southern Africa
chorister robin-chat
chorister robin-chat
Taxonomy articles created by Polbot